Interport matches refer to a series of cricket matches which took place in Asia from 1866 to 1987, between Ceylon, the Federated Malay States, Hong Kong, Malaya, Malaysia, Shanghai, Singapore and the Straits Settlements.

In February 2020, the Hong Kong team played a five-match Twenty20 International (T20I) series against Malaysia. All the matches were played at the Kinrara Academy Oval, Kuala Lumpur. The series marked the return of Interport matches after a gap of 33 years. The series was originally scheduled to be played at the Mission Road Ground in Mong Kok, Hong Kong, but was cancelled in early February due to the coronavirus pandemic in China.

History
Hong Kong were returning home on the SS Bokhara from their 1892 Interport match in Shanghai when it sank in a typhoon, killing eleven Hong Kong cricketers. As a result of this tragedy the Interport matches, which had been regular fixtures since 1889, didn't return for five years.

For matches in Shanghai, it was usually only Hong Kong who made the journey but when Hong Kong were Interport hosts, a third of fourth team would often join Shanghai for a series of matches.

No series or match was played from 1936 until 1947 due to the Pacific War. Shanghai stopped participating in Interport cricket after 1948, when the Communist Party took over China.

Statistics

Team results summary
Result of some Interport matches are unknown so in the table below the combined wins, draws and losses may not add up to the total matches played by the team.

Record performances
The accuracy of some of the scorecards given for Interport matches have been disputed. The table below shows the leading team and individual performances over the years.

Matches played

Series played

References

External links
CricketArchive website

China in international cricket
Hong Kong in international cricket
Malaysia in international cricket
Singapore in international cricket
Sri Lanka in international cricket